In number theory, Niven's constant, named after Ivan Niven, is the largest exponent appearing in the prime factorization of any natural number n "on average". More precisely, if we define H(1) = 1 and H(n) = the largest exponent appearing in the unique prime factorization of a natural number n > 1, then Niven's constant is given by

where ζ is the Riemann zeta function.

In the same paper Niven also proved that

where h(1) = 1, h(n) = the smallest exponent appearing in the unique prime factorization of each natural number n > 1, o is little o notation, and the constant c is given by

and consequently that

References

Further reading
 Steven R. Finch, Mathematical Constants (Encyclopedia of Mathematics and its Applications), Cambridge University Press, 2003

External links
 
 

Mathematical constants
Number theory